Paranormal Paparazzi is an American entertainment-and-lifestyle paranormal reality television news series which originally aired on the Travel Channel from September 28, 2012, to November 8, 2012. Based in part on host Aaron Sagers' entertainment website, paranormalpopculture.com, the series is set in a newsroom and showcases paranormal researchers as they investigate locations throughout the United States believed to have paranormal activity.

Episodes

Series Cast

Julie Alexandria, Rachel Fine, Scott Gruenwald, Dave B. Mitchell, Aaron Sagers, Joshua P. Warren, 
Branden Wellington, Thom Reed, Jonathon The Impaler Sharkey,
Thomas John, Sona Oganesyan, J. Adam Smith, Glen Warner

References

External links
 
 Travel Channel page
 

2010s American documentary television series
2012 American television series debuts
Paranormal reality television series
Travel Channel original programming